Abortion in Belgium was fully legalised on 4 April 1990. Abortion is legal until 12 weeks after conception (14 weeks after the last menstrual period).  The woman is required to receive counselling at least six days prior to the abortion and to check in with her doctor to monitor her health in the weeks after the procedure. Later abortions are permitted if there is a risk to the woman's life or the fetus shows risk of birth defects.
, the abortion rate was 9.2 abortions per 1000 women aged 15–44 years.

Overview

Abortion in Belgium was first prohibited without exception by Articles 348 to 353 of the Belgian Criminal Code of 1867. Abortion was then defined as one of the crimes "against the order of families and against public morality". However, very few legal proceedings against illegal abortions took place until 1923, when a bill originally submitted by Henry Carton de Wiart in 1913 (but not formally debated until after World War I) was passed by the Belgian parliament that formally coded in legal penalties for incitement to abortion as well as advertising and promotion of contraception. Therapeutic abortions later took place in 1940 in some hospitals, while others were performed in the 1960s by some family planning centres in the French-speaking regions of Belgium.

In 1970, gynaecologist Dr. Willy Peers (fr; nl) founded the Belgian Society for the Legalisation of Abortion (SBLA). That same year, the Conseil national des femmes belges organised a debate on abortion. Networks were being set up to enable women to terminate their pregnancies. The Marie Mineur group in Wallonia connected women with doctors who performed abortions, while the Dolle Mina group in Flanders took women to the Netherlands to seek abortions. In 1971, the Callewaert law was tabled in an attempt to decriminalise abortion in Belgium for the first time, but was never passed.

On 18 January 1973, Peers was arrested for performing more than three hundred abortions in the Namur region. He spent 34 days in prison. Demonstrations for his release and revision of the law gathered several hundred thousand people. The mobilisation gave rise to a judicial truce that made it impossible to prosecute doctors for performing abortions. Between 1974 and 1978 there was a deadlock in political debates about abortion. During the same period, therapeutic abortions were unofficially permitted (and even reimbursed by some mutualities) as long as they were registered as "curettage". It was estimated that 20,000 abortions were performed each year, and clandestine abortions performed during the same period were also estimated to be as high as 74,000 to 150,000 (in comparison to 100,000 annual births). New public organisations related to the termination of pregnancy were created, such as the Committees for the Decriminalisation of Abortion in 1976, the Committee for the Suspension of Legal Proceedings in 1978 and the same year the appearance of GACEHPA, the Action Group of Out-of-Hospital Abortion Centres. The truce was finally broken in 1978 by several prosecutors' offices.

A collective trial against several doctors and a psychologist took place in Brussels in 1983.

Prior to 1990, due to the influences of the Catholic Church, Belgium remained one of the few European countries where abortion was illegal. When the law liberalising abortion was enacted, it was controversial to many Belgians. A bill to liberalise abortion was first submitted by Senators Lucienne Herman-Michielsens and Roger Lallemand in early 1990, and despite the opposition of the ruling Christian People's Party, a coalition of the Flemish and Wallonian Socialist and Liberal parties in the federal lower house passed a law to liberalise abortion in Belgium. The Belgian bishops appealed to the population at large with a public statement that expounded their doctrinal and pastoral opposition to the law. They warned Belgian Catholics that anyone who co-operated "effectively and directly" in the procurement of abortions was "excluding themselves from the ecclesiastical community." Motivated by the strong stance of the Belgian bishops and the fact that he and his wife Queen Fabiola had not been able to bear any children themselves, King Baudouin notified the Prime Minister on 30 March that he could not sign the law without violating his conscience as a Catholic. Since the legislation would not have the force of law without the king's signature (royal assent), his refusal to sign threatened to precipitate a constitutional crisis. However, the problem was resolved by an agreement between the king and Prime Minister Martens, by which the Belgian government used a constitutional mechanism which declared the king unable to govern, assumed his authority and enacted the law “in the name of the Belgian people”, after which the Federal Parliament then voted to reinstate the king the next day. The Vatican described the king's action as a "noble and courageous choice" dictated by a "very strong moral conscience". Others have suggested that Baudouin's action was "little more than a gesture", since he was reinstated as king just 44 hours after he was removed from power.

The current Belgian abortion law dates from 15 October 2018, when the Michel I Government removed abortus provocatus from the Belgian criminal code and placed it into a separate law. In this revision, while several sanctions would de jure remain in place, the concept of "emergency" would disappear. With regard to the cooling-off period, the six days could be added to the twelve-week period, and would also lapse in the event of urgent medical reasons. Also, a doctor who refuses to perform an abortion would be required to refer the patient to another doctor. This bill was submitted together with a bill on the recognition of miscarriages for civil status, intended to meet the psychological suffering that a miscarriage causes to parents. Although it was denied that there was a formal link between the recognition of stillborn children and the removal of abortion from the Criminal Code, some critics saw this as a hidden way to reduce or complicate the right to abortion.

Earlier, the opposition parties already submitted bills to completely decriminalise abortion and to include it in the patients' rights law. In those proposals, the legal deadline would be increased to 18 weeks and the reflection period would be shortened to 48 hours, because six days was considered too long. Extending that period was intended to put an end to the so-called abortion tourism of women who are more than 12 weeks pregnant but still want an abortion. Until now, such women have often travelled to neighbouring countries such as the Netherlands or France to seek abortions, where longer legal deadlines apply.

Public opinion 
In a survey carried out by the Centre d'action laïque in 2018, 75.4% of Belgians agree that abortion should not be a crime, 16.6% disagree, 5.7% said they are neither for nor against, and 2.3% were unable or unwilling to answer.

References

Belgium
Belgium
Women in Belgium
Healthcare in Belgium